Saïd Business School (Oxford Saïd or SBS) is the business school of the University of Oxford. The school is a provider of management education and is consistently ranked as one of the world's top business schools.

The Oxford MBA has a strong reputation for entrepreneurship and, in particular, social entrepreneurship. Every year, ~9% of the MBA graduates start their own venture right after graduation - a figure surpassed only by Stanford GSB (17%) and Harvard Business School (9%). In 2020 and 2021, Oxford Said was ranked #20 globally in PitchBook's ranking of MBA programs for founders and #14 for female founders. In PitchBook's 2022 ranking for number of graduates and MBAs who have founded capital-backed companies, Oxford ranked #8 worldwide, with 1,083 founders starting 905 companies and raising $34 billion in capital.

The Oxford School of Management Studies was rebranded as Saïd Business School in 1996 after a donation from Wafic Saïd. New premises were built on Park End Street and opened in 2001. The Thatcher Business Education Centre was opened on the same site in 2012 after a further donation from Saïd. The School has another centre at Egrove Park, on the former site of Templeton College, and in 2019 acquired an old power station in Osney to convert into a Global Leadership Centre.

Saïd Business School is the University of Oxford's department for graduate students in business, management and finance. Undergraduates are also taught as part of the Economics and Management course together with the Economics Department.

As of June 2022, the Dean of Said Business School is Professor Soumitra Dutta.

History

Business education at the University of Oxford dates back to 1965, when the Oxford Centre for Management Studies was founded. The centre was renamed Templeton College in 1983 as a result of a donation from Sir John Templeton.

In 1988 a committee chaired by Sir Claus Moser (warden of Wadham College) recommended that the University set up a new School of Management Studies. The University agreed to establish a Business School in 1990 and the Oxford School of Management Studies was set up in premises at the Old Radcliffe Infirmary with its first intake of students arriving in 1993. The first director was Dr Clark Brundin, who had been the vice-chancellor of the University of Warwick since 1985. He was also appointed as president of Templeton College.

Saïd Business School was founded in 1996 when Syrian-born businessman Wafic Saïd offered the University a donation of £20 million. A site for the new premises was found on Park End Street opposite Oxford railway station on what was formerly the Oxford Rewley Road railway station. The building was designed by Edward Jones and Sir Jeremy Dixon. The opening on 5 November 2001 was accompanied by a demonstration by students concerned about the controversial nature of Wafic Saïd's donation.  Saïd was linked with the UK's signing of the Al-Yamamah arms deal.

In 2007 Templeton College merged with Green College to form Green Templeton College, based on the existing Green College site. The former Templeton site at Egrove Park then became the Saïd Business School Executive Education Centre. In 2012 the Thatcher Business Education Centre, financed by a donation from Saïd, was opened on the Park End Street site. Saïd donated a further £15 million in 2019 to finance the conversion of the old Osney power station into a Global Leadership Centre.

In 2020 Saïd Business School lost an employment tribunal case brought by its former director of custom executive education. The tribunal found that the whistleblower had been unfairly dismissed and awarded her £1,499,606.62.

Degree programmes

Saïd Business School's main degree programmes are its one-year full-time MBA programme, 21-month modular Executive MBA programme, the DPhil or PhD Programme in Management Studies, the MSc in Financial Economics in cooperation with the Economics Department, the two-year MSc in Major Programme Management and the one-year MSc in Law and Finance (MLF) in conjunction with the Oxford Law Faculty.

Undergraduate programme

Saïd Business School offers one undergraduate programme: Bachelor of Arts in Economics and Management. This programme is taught jointly by the Department of Economics and the Business School.

Graduate programmes

MBA
Saïd Business School offers a one-year full-time Master of Business Administration degree, which enrolls approximately 320 students per year. In the 2018–2019 class of 315 students, 61%  were male and 39% were female with 62 nationalities represented and averaged 5 years of work experience. The MBA programme was updated for the 2014/15 academic year

EMBA

Saïd Business School also offers a 21-month part-time 'Executive Master of Business Administration' degree designed for people with more than 5 years’ management experience. The Oxford EMBA is studied through 16 week-long modules largely taught in Oxford, but with at least two conducted in key international markets. As of 2016, the programme ran two iterations per year, with new cohorts starting in both January and September. There were 60 students in September 2016 class, from 21 different nationalities and 28% of which are women. There are several scholarships for women available each year for outstanding candidates.

1+1 MBA

Dean Peter Tufano started the Oxford 1+1 MBA programme which allows students to pair the one-year full-time MBA programme with one of a selection of one-year MSc programmes offered by other University of Oxford departments.

MSc in Major Programme Management (MMPM)

The School runs a part-time two-year MSc in Major Programme Management. It accepts approximately 50-60 students per cohort, running a programme that features 8 modules and a thesis. Module topics (in 2022) are: 

 Designing and managing successful programmes
 Major programme risk
 Systems thinking
 Governance and stakeholder management
 Commercial leadership
 Research methods
 Managing performance
 Globalisation and major programmes

MSc in Global Healthcare Leadership

The School starts a part-time (hybrid) two-year MSc in Global Healthcare Leadership in September 2022/23 academic year. It was intended to start in the 2021/22 year but deferred due to the COVID-19 pandemic. This programme is being managed under both Said Business School and Nuffield Department of Primary Care Health Services. It has 8 modules each proceeded by a week of teachings in Oxford.

Academic performance

University of Oxford is 1st in the 2022 Times Higher Education World University Rankings.

In the QS MBA rankings by Career Specialization, the Oxford MBA had the following rankings globally:

Finance: #7 in 2021 and 2023.

Entrepreneurship: #4 in 2019, #10 in 2021, and #7 in 2023.

Information Management: #12 in 2021 and #5 in 2023.

Technology: #9 in 2021 and #3 in 2023.

Consulting: #24 in 2021 and #19 in 2023. 

In the 2023 CEO World Magazine B-school rankings, Oxford Said ranked 5th globally. 

In the Financial Times E-MBA ranking, Oxford Said ranked #17, #10, #18, #12, #15 globally from 2018-2022.

Admissions

Admissions to the Oxford Full-Time MBA program is highly competitive. Out of ~2,000 applicants each year, 1 in 4 are offered a seat at the Oxford MBA, with ~70% of the admits accepting the offer. The 25% acceptance rate is in line with the rates at the Top 10-15 US B-schools (based on USNews Rankings). 

The 2022-23 cohort of students on the MBA course comprised 64 different nationalities, with 93% coming from outside the UK. Nearly half (48%) were women. The median GMAT score was 690 and median GRE composite score was 320 (Quant - 160; Verbal - 160). The cohort's average work experience was 5 years and average age was 29 years.

Administration

For administrative purposes, Saïd Business School is part of the University of Oxford's Social Sciences Division.
In June 2022 Professor Soumitra Dutta, former Professor of Management at the Cornell SC Johnson College of Business at Cornell University in New York, took up the position of Dean, replacing interim Dean Sue Dopson, Professor of Organisational Behaviour and Fellow of Green Templeton College.  Previous Deans were Professor Peter Tufano (2011-2021), Professor Colin Mayer (2006–2011), Professor Anthony Hopwood (1999–2006) and Professor Sir John Kay (1996–1998).

Notable alumni

 
 Axel Addy (EMBA) – Minister for Commerce & Industry of Liberia
 Javed Afridi (PhD) Chief Executive Officer (CEO) of Haier Pakistan
 Mohamed Amersi (EMBA) - British businessman and philanthropist
 Shawn Baldwin (MFS) - American investor
 Michael Bates, Baron Bates (EMBA) - Minister of State for International Development
 Terry Beech (MBA) - Member of Parliament, Canada
 Ananya Birla - Indian singer and entrepreneur
 George Bridgewater (MBA) – New Zealand Olympic rower
 Caryn Davies (MBA) – USA Olympic rower
 Segun Toyin Dawodu (MGHL) - CEO, PMREHAB and editor, dawodu.com
 Ruthe Farmer (MBA) - American policymaker and activist
 Elizabeth Filippouli – Greek broadcaster, entrepreneur and global business strategist
 Tim Foster (EMBA) – British Olympic rower
 Þorsteinn B. Friðriksson (MBA) - Icelandic mobile app entrepreneur
 Toshiharu Furukawa (MBA) – Japanese politician, Professor at Keio University
 Patrick Grant (EMBA) – British fashion designer
 Ante Kušurin (MBA) – Croatian Olympic rower
 Dame Emily Lawson (MBA) - head of the NHS COVID-19 vaccine programme
 Stephen Robert Morse (MBA) journalist and film director/producer
 Claire Diaz Ortiz (MBA) – American, Twitter, Fast Company's 100 Most Creative People in Business
 Papa CJ (MBA) – Indian comedian
 Kenges Rakishev – Kazakhstan investor
 Jane Silber (MBA) - American businesswoman and computer scientist
 Colin Smith (MBA) – British Olympic rower
 Storm Uru (MBA) – New Zealand Olympic rower
 Cameron Winklevoss (MBA) – USA Olympic rower and Internet entrepreneur
 Tyler Winklevoss (MBA) – USA Olympic rower and Internet entrepreneur
 Andriy Zagorodnyuk – Ukrainian technology entrepreneur and former Minister of defence of Ukraine

Faculty

 Kunal Basu
 Richard Cuthbertson
 Pamela Hartigan
 Nancy Hubbard
 Tim Jenkinson
 Colin Mayer
 Andrew T. Stephen
 Peter Tufano
 Richard Whittington

See also
 List of business schools in Europe
 List of University of Oxford people

References

External links
 Official website of Saïd Business School

 
Educational institutions established in 1996
Business schools in England
Departments of the University of Oxford
1996 establishments in England